Jenny Byrne and Michelle Jaggard were the defending champions but they competed with different partners that year, Byrne with Janine Tremelling and Jaggard with Katerina Maleeva.

Byrne and Tremelling lost in the quarterfinals to Katrina Adams and Zina Garrison, as did Jaggard and Maleeva to Larisa Savchenko and Natasha Zvereva.

Savchenko and Zvereva won in the final 6–2, 6–1 against Adams and Garrison.

Seeds
Champion seeds are indicated in bold text while text in italics indicates the round in which those seeds were eliminated.

 Larisa Savchenko /  Natasha Zvereva (champions)
 Katrina Adams /  Zina Garrison (final)
 Elise Burgin /  Rosalyn Fairbank (semifinals)
 Beth Herr /  Candy Reynolds (semifinals)

Draw

References
 1988 Virginia Slims of Indianapolis Doubles Draw

Virginia Slims of Indianapolis
1988 WTA Tour